Selichot (singular: , səlīḥā) are Jewish penitential poems and prayers, especially those said in the period leading up to the High Holidays, and on fast days. The Thirteen Attributes of Mercy are a central theme throughout these prayers.

Selichot of the High Holidays 

In the Sephardic tradition, recital of Selichot in preparation for the High Holidays begins on the second day of the Hebrew month of Elul. In the Ashkenazic tradition, it begins on the Saturday night before Rosh Hashanah. If, however, the first day of Rosh Hashanah falls on Monday or Tuesday, Selichot are said beginning the Saturday night prior to ensure that Selichot are recited at least four times. This may be because originally the pious would fast for ten days during the season of repentance, and four days before Rosh Hashanah were added to compensate for the four of the Ten days of Repentance on which fasting is forbidden – the two days of Rosh Hashanah, Shabbat Shuvah, and the day preceding Yom Kippur—and, while the fasts have since been abandoned, the Selichot that accompanied them have been retained. Alternatively, the Rosh Hashanah liturgy includes the Biblical phrase, "you shall observe a burnt offering", and like an offering which needs to be scrutinised for defects for four days, so too four days of self-searching are needed before the day of judgment. In the Italian rite, Selichot always begin on a Monday or Thursday shortly before Rosh Hashanah. If Rosh Hashanah falls on Monday, they begin the previous Monday.  If Rosh Hashanah falls on a Tuesday, they begin on the Monday eight days before.  If Rosh Hashana falls on Thursday, they begin the previous Thursday.  If Rosh Hashanah falls on Shabbat, they begin the Monday of that week.

Selichot refers to both the poetic piyyutim that compose the service as well as to the service itself. In most modern Sephardic communities, Selichot services are identical each day. However, some North African communities still recite different Selichot on Mondays, Thursdays and Shabbat, following the order in Siftei Renanot, while keeping the "standard" order on days without Torah Reading. In the Eastern Ashkenazic tradition, although the text and length of specific prayers varies from day to day, the overall format remains the same and is prefaced by Ashrei and the Half-Kaddish.  In the Western Ashkenazic tradition, there is similarly an overall format, but it begins with Adon Olam or Lecha Hashem Ha'Tzedaka, and the Half-Kaddish follows the first set of the thirteen attributes.

Selichot are usually recited between midnight and dawn. Some recite it at night after the Maariv prayer, or in the morning before the Shacharit prayer, due to the convenience of synagogue attendance when a prayer is already taking place there.

The most popular night of Selichot in the Ashkenazi tradition is the first night, when many women and girls as well as men and boys attend the late-night service on Saturday night. In some communities, the hazzan wears a kittel and sings elaborate melodies. In some congregations, it is not unusual for a choir to participate in this first night's service. In the Eastern Ashkenazic tradition, this night also has more Selichot than any other night prior to Rosh Hashanah eve. The other nights are more sparsely attended and those services are often led by a layperson, rather than a trained musician, and with melodies that are less elaborate than the first night.

In addition to the Selichot of the High Holiday period, the recitation of Selichot on Yom Kippur itself is the centerpiece and most important part of the liturgy, recited in all of the prayers of the day.  Beginning in the late 19th Century, many communities in Eastern Europe stopped reciting Selichot except at Maariv and Neilah. Western Ashkenazic communities, as well as a small number of Eastern Ashkenazic communities, maintain the recitation of Selichot in all of the prayers of Yom Kippur.  Italian rite communities recite Selichot on Yom Kippur in all of the prayers except Musaf. Sephardic communities also recite Selichot at all of the prayers of Yom Kippur, although they recite them after the Chazzan's repetition rather than as a part of it.

Categories of Selichot 
Categories of Selichot in the Ashkenazic tradition may include:
 Selichah (סליחה) – Hebrew for "forgiveness." This is the default Selichah and comprises the vast majority of the Selichot service. These can be subdivided into categories of Sheinya (with two line stanzas), Shelishiya (with three line stanzas) and Shalmonit (with four line stanzas).
 Pizmon (פזמון) – Hebrew for "chorus." These central Selichot vary according to the day and contain a chorus which is repeated after each stanza.
 Akeidah (עקידה) – Hebrew for "binding", a word which specifically refers to the Binding of Isaac. This Selichah contains the theme of the Akeidah as a merit for God answering our prayers. It begins to appear on Rosh Hashanah eve and is placed immediately before or after the Pizmon.
 Chatanu (חטאנו) – Hebrew for "we have sinned." Starting on the evening before Rosh Hashanah [and in the Western rites, even on the first days] and continuing through Yom Kippur, this Selichah is said after the final recitation of the Thirteen Attributes and before the Vidui confessional. It contains as its refrain, "חטאנו צורנו סלח לנו יוצרנו", "We have sinned, our Rock, forgive us, our Creator". Perhaps the most famous Chatanu Selichah is the Eleh Ezkera Martyrology recited in the Eastern Ashkenazic rite during Musaf on Yom Kippur or at other times in other rites, though the recitation of the aforementioned refrain is not always followed in this particular Chatanu.
 Techinah (תחינה) – Hebrew for "petition". This Selichah begins to appear on the eve of Rosh Hashanah and other days in some rites, during Tachnun at the very end of the Selichot service.

Selichot of Fast Days 

On minor fast days (including the Fast of Behav), some communities recite Selichot after the conclusion of the Shacharit Amidah. The content of these prayers is related to the specific fast day. In some communities (especially Western Ashkenazic communities, but also some Eastern Ashkenazic communities), the older practice is maintained to insert the recitation of the Selichot of minor fast days in the middle of the blessing for forgiveness (סלח לנו כי חטאנו) in the repetition of the Shacharit Amidah.

In Ashkenazic commuinities, Selichot are recited on the Fast of Gedaliah only before the prayer service like the selichot of the High Holidays; in many Sephardic communities, additional selichot are recited after the Amidah just like any other fast day. Selichot are not recited in any community today on the major fast day of Tisha B'Av, although they were recited by the Geonim of Babylonia.

Selichot on other occasions
In addition to High Holidays and Fast Days, there were communities that recited Selichot on Hoshana Rabbah.

Additionally, in the early modern period, there were "shomerim la-boker societies" which recited Selichot on every day of the year that Tachanun is recited.

Selichot rites 
There are at least thirteen Ashkenzic printed rites for selichot:

The following eight are variations of the Western Ashkenazic rite:
Frankfurt and its surroundings
Alsace
Italian Ashkenazim
Nuremberg and Fürth
Switzerland and Swabia
Worms
Cologne
Floß

The following five are variations of the Eastern Ashkenazic rite:
Poland (Polin)
Bohemia, Moravia and Hungary
Lithuania and Samogitia (Lita and Zamut)
Poznań and Grodno
Old Synagogue in Prague

Among 21st century Ashkenazi Jewish communities, the Polin and Lita variations are dominant, although Bohemia is the most common in England. Some associate Lita with Nusach Ashkenaz and Polin with Nusach Sefard, likely because in early 20th Century most Jews in Poland had adopted Nusach Sefard, whereas most Jews in Lithuania maintained Nusach Ashkenaz.  However, the differences between Polin and Lita Selichot have origins several hundred years before the advent of Nusach Sefard, and the minhagim were geographic rather than ideological. Chabad recites Selichot according to Nusach Lita because they are from Lithuania, and there are Polish mitnagdim who recite Selichot according to Nusach Polin.

The poems recited in the major variations, with their assigned numbers, are as follows (page numbers in square brackets):

References

External links 
 Chabad.org: Selichot
 Jewish Virtual Library: Selichot
 Text of Selichot (Ashkenazi Lita rite) with English translation

Elul
Hebrew words and phrases
High Holy Days
Jewish liturgical poems
Jewish prayer and ritual texts
Jewish services
Ten Days of Repentance
Yom Kippur
Hebrew words and phrases in Jewish prayers and blessings
Elul observances
Tishrei observances
Tishrei